Steele is not a given name currently or in known history.

People
 Steele Bishop (born 1953), Australian former track racing cyclist and world champion
 Steele Hall (born 1928), Australian politician, 36th Premier of South Australia
 Steele Johnson (born 1996), American diver
 Steele MacKaye (1842-1894), American playwright, actor, theater manager and inventor
 Steele Retchless (born 1971), Australian rugby league footballer
 Steele Rudd, pseudonym of Australian author Arthur Hoey Davis (1868–1935)
 Steele Savage (1900-1970), American illustrator
 Steele Sidebottom (born 1991), Australian rules football player
 Steele Stanwick (born 1989), American collegiate lacrosse player

Mononyms
 el Steele (wrestler)
 Steele (rapper)

Fictional characters
 Steele, the villain in the animated film Balto

See also
 Steele (surname)
 Steele (disambiguation)